In the law enforcement system in Japan,  are prefecture-level law enforcement agencies responsible for policing, law enforcement, and public security within their respective prefectures of Japan. Although prefectural police are, in principle, regarded as municipal police, they are mostly under the central oversight and control of the National Police Agency.

As of 2017, the total strength of the prefectural police is approximately 260,400 sworn officers and 28,400 civilian staff, a total of 288,000 employees.

History

After the surrender of Japan, the Supreme Commander for the Allied Powers regarded this centralized police system as undemocratic. During the occupation of Japan, the principle of decentralisation was introduced by the 1947  (now commonly referred to as "Old Police Law"). However, most Japanese municipalities were too small to have an effectively large police force, so sometimes they were unable to deal with large-scale violence. In addition, excessive fragmentation of the police organisation reduced the efficiency of police activities.

As a response to these problems, complete restructuring created a more centralized system under the 1954 amended . All operational units except for the Imperial Guard were reorganized into the prefectural police departments for each prefecture and the National Police Agency was established as the central coordinating agency for these police departments.

Organisation
Each prefectural police department comprises a police authority and operational units: Prefectural Public Safety Commissions (PPSC) and Prefectural Police Headquarters (PPH).

Prefectural Public Safety Commission

 are administrative committees established under the jurisdiction of prefectural governors to provide citizen oversight for police activities. A committee consists of three members in an ordinary prefecture and five members in urban prefectures. The members of prefectural public safety commission are appointed by the governor with the consent of the prefectural assembly.

Prefectural Police Headquarters

The  are appointed officials at the top of the chain of command in each Prefectural Police Headquarters.

These police departments are responsible for every police actions within their jurisdiction in principle, but most important activities are regulated by the National Police Agency. Designation and dismissal of these high-ranking officers are delegated to the National Public Safety Commission.

Each Prefectural police headquarters contains administrative departments (bureaus in the TMPD) corresponding to those of the bureaus of the National Police Agency as follows:
 
 
 
 
 

There are some 289,000 police officers nationwide, about 97% of whom were affiliated with Prefectural Police Headquarters.

Community policing 

In the Japanese police, community policing is treated as being close to crime prevention, and in rural prefectural police, community safety departments in charge of crime prevention sometimes concurrently handle community policing. Community policing officers are organised into several .  Each station includes the following sections:
 
 
 
 
 
 

These community policing officers are supported by the community police department or the community safety department of the prefectural police headquarters.

Traffic policing 

Originally traffic policing was mainly done by community policing officers. However, with the progress of motorization since the 1950s, traffic accidents have increased dramatically, resulting in the so-called traffic war, the system of traffic police was also strengthened.

Traffic cars (including unmarked cars) and police motorcycles are deployed in these units.

Criminal investigation 

In the Empire of Japan, the criminal investigation was presided over by prosecutors, like the ministère public does in French law. With the 1947 Police Law (ja) and the 1948 Code of Criminal Procedure (ja), the responsibility of investigation has been defined to be uniquely assigned to police officers. In order to fulfil this responsibility, criminal investigation departments or criminal investigation bureaus (judiciary police) were set up in each police organisation. After the establishment of the 1954 amended Police Law, these departments are supervised by the Criminal Affairs Bureau of the National Police Agency.

The  are first responders for initial criminal investigations, distributed among the region with unmarked cars. The  are specialised detective units of the first investigation divisions, well acquainted with new technology and special tactics including tactical capabilities. They are mandated for critical incidents except for terrorism, but in some rural but well-versed prefectural police like Aomori Prefectural Police, these detectives can form a counterterrorism task force together with uniformed officers and riot specialists.

Public security 

In other PPHs, their security departments are in charge of all public security policing matters; but in the departments, they are divided in the same way as they are done by the MPD. They are supervised by the Security Bureau of the National Police Agency.

Within their security departments or bureaus, each PPH maintains , which serve as a rapid reaction force capable of fulfilling riot police, police tactical unit, and search and rescue roles. Full-time riot police can also be augmented by regular police trained in riot duties.

Counterterrorism operations are also the affairs of the security departments. These units are established within the RPU basically, but the SAT of the TMPD and Osaka PPH are under direct control of their Security Bureau (TMPD) or Department (Osaka PPH).

Ranks
Police officers are divided into nine ranks:

The National Police Agency Commissioner General holds the highest position of the Japanese police. His title is not a rank, but rather denotes his position as head of the NPA. On the other hand, the Tokyo Metropolitan Police Department Superintendent General represents not only the highest rank in the system but also assignment as head of the TMPD.

Equipment

Uniform
In the pre-war period, police officers wore jackets with a stand-up collar. In 1946, the jacket was changed to four-buttons, open-collar style with vent and in 1950, a new police duty belt to wear gun and baton was adopted. But at this point, the uniforms of the National Rural Police and the municipal police differed in details.

During a reorganization in 1954, uniforms were to be unified across the country, but because that would take time, only the class chapter was unified at this time. After that, in 1956, a new uniform was adopted. The jacket became the turned-down collar style with three buttons, and the vent was done away with. Also, at this time, the summer clothes became grey, but in 1968 it was changed to greyish blue. On 1st April 1994, current uniform design was adopted across all of Japan.

Through the campaign against the Treaty of Mutual Cooperation and Security Between the United States and Japan at the end of the 1960s, helmets and protective gear for riot police officers were improved. On the other hand, general police officers were wearing blade-deflecting vests under uniforms so that they would not be noticeable, but since 2005, a strong stab vest to overlay on the uniform was adopted. And in the case of gun violence, bulletproof vests and helmets are also equipped. Ordinary police officers, riot police officers, SWAT detectives, and counter-terrorism operators use different vests of different standards.

Service weapon
In the pre-war period, most Japanese law enforcement officials only had a sabre. Only some elite detectives, bodyguards, or tactical units such as the Emergency Service Unit of the TMPD were issued pistols. The FN Model 1910 or Colt Model 1903 were used for open-carry uses, and Colt Model 1908 Vest Pocket or FN M1905 for concealed carry. During the Occupation, the Supreme Commander for the Allied Powers suggested them to be equipped with firearms. Because of the insufficient stocks and lack of domestically produced handguns, Japanese police started to receive service pistols leased from the Allies from 1949, and by 1951, all officers were issued pistols.

In the beginning, the makes and models of these sidearms varied, but M1911 pistols and M1917 revolvers, Smith & Wesson Military & Police and Colt Official Police were issued as the mostly standard sidearms. The .38 calibre revolvers were well-received, but .45 calibre handguns were too large to carry for somewhat small officers, especially women. And M1917 revolvers in particular were obsolete, deteriorated significantly, and so malfunction or reduced accuracy had been a problem. As a response to these issues, the National Rural Police Headquarters started to import small .38 Special calibre revolvers such as Smith & Wesson Chiefs Special and Colt Detective Special. During the 1960s, procurement began to migrate to the domestic Minebea "New Nambu" M60. When the production of the M60 was completed in the 1990s, deployment of small semi-automatic pistols was considered, but this plan was abandoned after small numbers of SIG Sauer P230 were deployed. Finally, imports from the United States were resumed, with S&W M37 and M360 revolvers having been purchased for uniformed officers. Their duty ammo is the Remington 158 grain lead round nose. And some elite detectives, bodyguards, or counter-terrorism units such as the Special Assault Team being equipped with 9×19mm Parabellum calibre semi-automatic pistols such as the Heckler & Koch USP.

From sometime in the 1970s, the Special Armed Police (ancestor of the Special Assault Team of the TMPD) introduced Heckler & Koch MP5A5/SD6/K submachine guns. From 2002, local counter-terrorism units (anti-firearms squads) were started to be equipped with MP5F, and there are also assault rifles in the SAT and urban AFS units. Tactical units of crime branches (Special Investigation Team of the TMPD, for example) also introduced a semi-automatic pistol-caliber carbine variant of MP5K (unofficially called the MP5SFK).

Initially, the sniper team was established in the 1960s, the Howa Golden Bear (original model of the Weatherby Vanguard) has been used as a sniper rifle, then, it has been updated to the Howa M1500. In the Special Assault Teams, Heckler & Koch PSG1 and L96A1 also been deployed.

For Japanese police, service pistols are generally left at work when they are not on duty.

Transportation

Ground
In Japan, there are about 40,000 police vehicles nationwide with the average patrol cruisers being Toyota Crowns and similar large sedans, although small compact and micro cars are used by rural police boxes and in city centres where they are much more manoeuvrable. Pursuit vehicles depend on prefectures with the Honda NSX, Subaru Impreza, Subaru Legacy, Mitsubishi Lancer, Nissan Skyline, Mazda RX-7, and Nissan Fairlady Z are all used in various prefectures for highway patrols and pursuit uses.

With the exception of unmarked vehicles, all PPHs vehicles are painted and marked in the same ways. Ordinary police vehicles are painted black and white with the upper parts of the vehicle painted white. Motorcycles are usually all white. Vehicles for riot police units are painted blue and white, and especially vehicles for the Rescue Squads of the TMPD are painted green and white.

Aviation
In Japan, the deployment of police helicopters began in 1960. They are extensively used for traffic reporting, the pursuit of suspects, search and rescue, airlift or many other missions. Total of about 80 helicopters are being operated in 47 prefectures nationwide. Some helicopters are equipped with stabilised TV camera and microwave link systems.

Watercraft
Police watercraft of Japan are divided into five groups: 23-meter type, 20-meter type, 17-meter type, 12-meter type, 8-meter type. As of 2014, 159 vessels are deployed nationwide. Since the Japan Coast Guard is in charge of the outside of ports, police watercraft are mainly mandated for rivers. However, sometimes they are dispatched to support police activities on the ground even on detached islands.

List of prefectural police departments 

Notes

References

Articles

Books

See also